The Inaugural Australian Academy of Cinema and Television Arts Awards, known more commonly as the AACTA Awards, presented by the Australian Academy of Cinema and Television Arts (AACTA), honoured the best Australian and foreign films of 2011 took place on two separate events, in Sydney, New South Wales: the AACTA Awards Luncheon, on 15 January 2012, at the Westin Hotel, and the AACTA Awards Ceremony, on 31 January 2012, at the Sydney Opera House. Following the establishment of the Australian Academy of Cinema and Television Arts, by the Australian Film Institute (AFI), these awards marked the inauguration of the AACTA Awards, but served as a continuum to the AFI Awards, which were presented by the AFI since 1958. The ceremony was televised on the Nine Network.

The nominees for the non-feature award categories were announced on 30 August 2011, and all other non-feature film, feature film and television nominees were announced at the National Institute of Dramatic Art (NIDA) on 30 November. The Academy presented awards for achievements in foreign film, and announced the nominees at the AACTA Awards Luncheon.

Background
On 18 August 2011, the Australian Academy of Cinema and Television Arts (AACTA) was established by the Australian Film Institute (AFI), to raise the profile of Australian film and television in Australia and abroad, and to change the way it rewards talent from its previous jury system, to the more recognised and understood elements of foreign film organisations. These awards will serve as a continuum to the Australian Film Institute Awards, which were presented by the Australian Film Institute. A gold statuette was created by Australian sculptor Ron Gomboc, which depicts "a human silhouette based on the shape of the Southern Cross constellation." The nominees and winners were determined by the Academy's fifteen Chapters, which comprise screen professionals from industry guilds and organisations including actors, directors, producers and screenwriters, who each decide the nominees in their individual fields and then vote for the winners of each category. The president of the awards is Australian actor Geoffrey Rush.

Works entered between 7 October 2010 and 2 November 2011 for films, and 5 May 2010 and 24 May 2011 for short films and documentaries were eligible for awards. The films in competition for the inaugural awards were revealed at the announcement of the Academy, with twenty-three Australian feature films originally slated to compete for awards, but it was eventually brought down to twenty-one, when two of the films, Burning Man and The Dragon Pearl, could no longer compete due to a change in their release dates. The films were showcased at the inaugural Festival of Film from 6 October – 14 November in Sydney and Melbourne, for the general public, and for Academy and AFI members to view and judge. The first nominees were announced on 30 August 2011, for non-feature film categories: Best Feature Length Documentary, Best Short Animation and Best Short Fiction Film. Round one voting for feature film categories commenced on 2 November and ended on 16 November. Following the announcement of the nominees on 30 November, round two voting commenced to determine the winners in each category, and ended on 14 December 2011. The first award to be announced was the Longford Lyell Award, which was presented to cinematographer Don McAlpine, at the AACTA awards luncheon, and marked the first award presented by the Academy since its inception. On 30 November 2011, the rest of the non-feature films, along with the entire feature film and television nominees, were announced at the National Institute of Dramatic Art in Sydney, and was hosted by Adam Elliot. Foreign films were also recognised at the AACTA International Awards ceremony, which handed out awards for Best Film, Best Direction, Best Screenplay, Best Actor and Best Actress. The nominees were announced at the AACTA Awards Luncheon on 15 January 2011, in conjunction with the Australia Week Black Tie Gala, and the winners were determined by a jury.

Ceremonies
The awards were presented over three separate events: the AACTA Awards Luncheon, at the Westin Hotel on 15 January 2012 and the AACTA Awards Ceremony, at the Sydney Opera House, in Sydney, New South Wales on 31 January 2012; and on 27 January, the AACTA International Awards at Soho House, West Hollywood, Los Angeles. The luncheon presented awards in film production, television, all non-feature film categories and the Longford Lyell Award; all other feature film and television awards were handed out at the ceremony; and the International awards presented accolades for films produced outside of Australia, regardless of geography. This marks the first time in ten years since the awards have been presented in Sydney, which had been held in Melbourne previously. The awards date has been shifted from its usual November/December date, to January 2012, to align them with the international film awards season. The awards ceremony was broadcast by the Nine Network.

Special awards
During the AACTA Awards luncheon, special non-competitive awards were handed out to individuals for their contribution to the Australian screen industry. The Longford Lyell Award, a lifetime achievement award, was presented to Don McAlpine, for his contributions to cinematography in feature film. Ivan Sen received the Byron Kennedy Award, an award given to a person in their early career, for: "his unique artistic vision and for showing us, by his resourceful multidisciplinary filmmaking, that telling stories on screen is in reach of all who have something consequential to say." The Outstanding Achievement in Television Screen Craft award was given to production designer Herbert Pinter, for his work on the television series Cloudstreet (2011).

Winners and nominees

Feature film
Winners are listed first and highlighted in boldface.

Television

Non-feature film

Additional awards

Films with multiple nominations
Fourteen: The Hunter
Twelve: The Eye of the Storm
Ten: Snowtown
Eight: Red Dog
Seven: Oranges and Sunshine
Five: Mad Bastards
Three: Legend of the Guardians: The Owls of Ga'Hoole and Sleeping Beauty, The Tall Man

Presenters and performers

Presenters
Presenters are listed alphabetically:

Cate Blanchett
Shane Bourne
Rob Carlton
Blake Davis
Alex Dimitriades
Gigi Edgley
Adam Elliot
Asher Keddie
Miranda Kerr
Anthony LaPaglia
Jonathan LaPaglia
Todd Lasance
Lincoln Lewis
Richard Roxburgh
Geoffrey Rush
Xavier Samuel
Rachael Taylor
Mia Wasikowska
Jacki Weaver
Samara Weaving
Richard Wilkins

Performers
Stephen Curry
Olivia Newton-John
Tim Rogers
Megan Washington

Gallery

See also
 1st AACTA International Awards
 AACTA Awards
 Australian films of 2011
 2011 in film

Notes
A: The following categories were presented at the AACTA Awards Luncheon, on 15 January 2012, before the main ceremony: Longford Lyell Award, Best Cinematography, Best Editing, Best Sound, Best Original Music Score, Best Production Design, Best Costume Design, Best Visual Effects, AFI Members' Choice Award, Best Feature Length Documentary, Best Documentary Under One Hour, Best Direction – Documentary, Best Cinematography – Documentary, Best Editing – Documentary, Best Sound – Documentary, Best Short Fiction Film, Best Short Animation, Best Screenplay – Short Film

B: The awards for Best Television Program and Best Performance are television awards, voted for by the public.

References

External links

 The Australian Academy of Cinema and Television Arts Official website

AACTA Awards ceremonies
AACTA Film Awards
AACTA Film Awards